Brian Cottle is a lawyer and judge from Saint Vincent and the Grenadines who has worked in a number of Commonwealth countries in the Caribbean.

Cottle earned his bachelor of laws degree from the University of the West Indies. From 1987 to 1990, he worked as a lawyer in Trinidad and Tobago. Between 1990 and 2002, he worked in the Attorney-General's office in three successive countries: Saint Vincent and the Grenadines (1990–1999), Montserrat (2000–2002), and Antigua and Barbuda (2002).

In 2002, he was appointed by the Judicial and Legal Services Commission of the Caribbean Community to be a master in the Eastern Caribbean Supreme Court; he was elevated to High Court Judge in 2007. As a member of the Court, since 2002 he has been assigned to reside in and hear cases from Grenada, Saint Lucia, and Dominica. His most recent transfer—to the Dominica High Court—was in 2009.

References
Eastern Caribbean Supreme Court: Commonwealth of Dominica
"New judge for Civil High Court", St. Lucia Star, 2009-11-07
"Vincentian Appointed as High Court Judge in Dominica", Star 98.3 & 104.7 News, 2009-08-20

Living people
Antigua and Barbuda lawyers
Montserratian lawyers
Saint Vincent and the Grenadines lawyers
20th-century Trinidad and Tobago lawyers
Saint Vincent and the Grenadines emigrants to Trinidad and Tobago
Saint Vincent and the Grenadines emigrants to Montserrat
Saint Vincent and the Grenadines emigrants to Antigua and Barbuda
Saint Vincent and the Grenadines judges on the courts of Grenada
Saint Vincent and the Grenadines judges on the courts of Saint Lucia
Saint Vincent and the Grenadines judges on the courts of Dominica
Eastern Caribbean Supreme Court justices
University of the West Indies alumni
Saint Vincent and the Grenadines judges of international courts and tribunals
Year of birth missing (living people)
21st-century Trinidad and Tobago judges